Melnsils (Livonian: Mustānum) is a populated place in Talsi Municipality in the Courland region of Latvia. One of the twelve Livonian villages on Līvõd Rānda - the Livonian Coast. Other names: Melnsil, Melsils.

Melnsils camping 

Melnsils camping site is located right by the sea, just 10 km away from Kolka, near the Slītere National Park, the sea-cliffs, and fascinating walking paths in the woods. It is located about 1 km from the highway P131.

Melnsils camping site is ideal for recreational activities and organization of sports events for up to 300 persons.

Climate 
The continental climate prevails in the area.  The annual average temperature  is 6 °C.  The warmest month is August, when the average temperature is 17 °C, and the coldest is January, with -4 °C.

See also 
Slītere National Park
Livonian Coast
Livonian people

References

External links 
 Melnsils campsite

Towns and villages in Latvia
Talsi Municipality
Courland